E.P.Onymous is the debut EP by Bellowhead.

Track listing

Personnel 
Jon Boden – vocals, fiddle, bagpipes
John Spiers – melodeon, vocals
Benji Kirkpatrick – mandolin, bouzouki, guitar, banjo
Andy Mellon – trumpet
Justin Thurgur – trombone
Brendan Kelly – saxophones
Pete Flood – percussion, cutlery
Rachael McShane – cello, vocals
Paul Sartin – fiddle, oboe
Giles Lewin – fiddle, bagpipes

Bellowhead albums
2004 EPs
Westpark Music EPs